Chornukhy is an urban-type settlement and the administrative center of Lubny Raion, Poltava Oblast of central Ukraine. Chornukhy is known as the birthplace of philosopher Gregory Skovoroda; a monument testifies to this.

Chornukhy is located on the river Mnoha. The territory of the settlement covers an area of 690 hectares. Village bus and a bus connection from Poltava, Kyiv, Lubny, Pyriatyn and Lokhvytsia. The total population of Chornukhy according to the Census on 1 January 2002 was 3138 inhabitants (2900 in 1984). Current population:

History
The year the town was founded is unknown. Chornukhy is first mentioned in 1261. It has been assumed that Chornukhy was initially a fortress built to protect against the Pechenegs and the Cumans and was established at the time of the Kievan Rus' state, but at the end of the 13th century it was destroyed by Mongol-Tatars. The next mention of the town appears in 1641. In 1647, Chornukhy was identified among the possessions of Prince Vyshnevetsky in Poltava.

In 1648 Chornukhy became  a centesimal town Lubensky Regiment.

In 1971, the town received the status of urban settlement.

Economy
The economy of the district is based on agriculture, which specializes in grain, sugar beets, sunflowers, milk, meat. The main producers of agricultural products are 15 agricultural limited liability companies and three private farms, OJSC Chornuhyptytsia and 10 farms.

Local facilities include: the Hotel Mnoha, the Poltava branch office of Bank Poltavabank, the Lubensky Chornukhiv Branch State Savings Bank of Ukraine, a Poltava Branch Office of the Aval Bank, "Privatbank". There are two ATMs.

Social conditions
The area contains 22 secondary schools, the Voronkivskyy branch Lazirkivsky vocational school N46, the Central District and two district hospitals, district polyclinics, 19 health posts, three medical dispensaries. On cultural and educational level care residents of the area in 1911 rural houses of culture, 14 rural clubs, a concert hall (opened in 2006 at the former cinema), the Central Regional Library, an Adult University, a regional library for children, 20 rural branch libraries and a children's music school. Chornukhynskyi literary memorial museum and 4 rural public museums are highly valued local cultural institutions. The district Culture House was recently destroyed by fire.

The newspaper "New job" is published twice a week since January 1932.

In the area there are nine religious communities, four Ukrainian Orthodox Churches and four houses of prayer. An Orthodox Church of Moscow Patriarchate in the city park continues to be constructed.

Famous inhabitants
 Gregory Skovoroda, Ukrainian philosopher, poet
 Kelembet A., church activist

References

External links
Офіційний сайт районної адміністрації
Чорнухи - громадський сайт
The murder of the Jews of Chornukhy during World War II, at Yad Vashem website

Urban-type settlements in Lubny Raion
Lokhvitsky Uyezd
Holocaust locations in Ukraine